Baugy may refer to the following places in France:

Baugy, Cher, a commune in the department of Cher
Baugy, Oise, a commune in the department of Oise
Baugy, Saône-et-Loire, a commune in the department of Saône-et-Loire